Samuel E. Barkley (May 24, 1858 – April 20, 1912) was an American Major League Baseball second baseman.

Career
He was still with the team when they joined the American Association for the  season, and was the everyday second baseman. He batted .306 that season and led the league in doubles with 39. Following the season, Toledo and the St. Louis Browns made an arrangement in the off-season for a trade involving several players, but the trade broke down after the waiting period and only Barkley and one other player actually played with St. Louis. After a lawsuit it was estimated that Barkley had been valued for $800. Chris von der Ahe later claimed that Barkley's value was $1,000, but that may have been the asking price.

In March 1886, Browns owner Chris von der Ahe offered Barkley for $1000 to the first team to pay the money. Billy Barnie was able to have Barkley sign an undated contract with the Baltimore Orioles and wired the asking price to Von der Ahe, but he had already secured a deal with owner of the Pittsburgh Alleghenys, Denny McKnight, and Sam was convinced to play for the Allegheny club instead. The American Association suspended and fined Barkley for signing with Pittsburgh this action. Barkley sued the Association, but they settled out of court with suspension being lifted although the fine stayed in place. Baltimore was offered and accepted Milt Scott as payment.

That first season with Pittsburgh, the  season, he hit .266 with 31 doubles, and he also stole 22 bases, while playing in 122 games. After the season was over, Pittsburgh sold him to the Kansas City Cowboys of the American Association.

On June 13, he hit for the cycle, and he was given the managerial reins, which lasted 58 games and 21 wins.

A knee injury ended his baseball career.

Post-baseball career
After his career in baseball ended, Barkley opened a cigar shop in Pittsburgh. After the cigar shop closed, Barkley and his wife Dora moved to Chicago. In Chicago he opened a saloon.

Barkley died at the age of 53 in his hometown of Wheeling, and was buried in Peninsula Cemetery.

Personal life
Barkley married Flora "Dora" Feldman, who took the name Dora Feldman Barkley after marriage. She was a young woman who he had met while playing in Kansas City. Dora, at the age of 18, grew infatuated with Barlkey and ran away from home to pursue him. Feldman stalked Barkley, and, at a Kansas City hotel room where he was staying, confronted him and threatened to commit suicide if he did not marry her. While he initially believed the young woman to be insane, he ultimately wed her, and they soon after had a child named Harold Barkley together. When they lived in Chicago, Dora, working as an actress, began a public affair with political boss, and former crime boss, Michael Cassius McDonald, who she had known in her childhood. It is believed that Barkley was paid $30,000 by McDonald to divorce his wife. The two divorced, and she wed McDonald, who also adopted the son he had with Dora, who would become known as Harold McDonald.

See also
 List of Major League Baseball annual doubles leaders
 List of Major League Baseball player–managers
 List of Major League Baseball players to hit for the cycle

References

External links
, or Retrosheet

1858 births
1912 deaths
Sportspeople from Wheeling, West Virginia
19th-century baseball players
Baseball players from West Virginia
Major League Baseball second basemen
Toledo Blue Stockings players
St. Louis Browns (AA) players
Pittsburgh Alleghenys players
Kansas City Cowboys players
Kansas City Cowboys (AA) managers
Toledo Blue Stockings (minor league) players
Toledo Black Pirates players
Major League Baseball player-managers